Stock car racing events in the NASCAR Xfinity Series has been held at the Homestead–Miami Speedway since the track's inauguration in 1995. For much of its history, it was the final race of the second-tier series' season. The event is currently named Contender Boats 300 for sponsorship reasons; with exception of one-off emergency races in 2020 and a one-off change in 2021, the race has been held as a 300-mile race.

Noah Gragson is the defending winner.

Race history
From 2002 to 2019, the race was a part of the Ford Championship Weekend, and was the Championship Round for the Xfinity Series. It previously took place the day before the Ford EcoBoost 400, the former Championship round of the NASCAR Cup Series playoffs.

In 2020, the race date was changed to early spring as part of a schedule realignment. Due to the COVID-19 pandemic, the race was moved to June and changed from a single 300-mile race to two races combined for a total distance of 501 miles, replacing a date at Iowa Speedway. Hooters assumed naming rights for the first race, while Contender Boats, a local boat manufacturer, sponsored the second, a Dash 4 Cash event. The Sunday race was originally named the 2020Census.gov 300 as the United States Census was going on at the time of the initially-scheduled date.

For the 2021 season, the race was originally announced as reverting to its original 300-mile distance with Contender Boats returning as title sponsor, but it instead remained at 250 miles with 167 laps and the Contender Boats 250 race name.

A NASCAR bulletin that Fox Sports' Bob Pockrass received notes the 300-mile distance will return in 2022.

Past winners

Notes
2004, 2014, 2020 II, & 2021: Races extended due to NASCAR overtime.
2020: Race postponed from March 21 due to COVID-19 pandemic; event format changed to twin 250-mile races due to Iowa Speedway's cancellation.
2021: Race moved from February 20 due to scheduling changes triggered by Auto Club Speedway's cancellation.

Track configuration notes
1995–1996: Rectangular oval
1997–2002: True oval; low banking
2003–present: True oval; steep, progressive banking

Multiple winners (drivers)

Multiple winners (teams)

Manufacturer wins

See also
Baptist Health 200
Dixie Vodka 400
Ford Championship Weekend

References

External links
 

1995 establishments in Florida
NASCAR Xfinity Series races
 
Recurring sporting events established in 1995
Ford Motor Company
Annual sporting events in the United States